The 2014–15 season was Peterborough United's 55th year in the Football League and their 2nd consecutive season in the third division of English football, Football League One.

Players

Squad information

Match details

Pre-season

League One

League table

Matches
The fixtures for the 2014–15 season were announced on 18 June 2014 at 9am.

FA Cup

The draw for the first round of the FA Cup was made on 27 October 2014.

League Cup

The draw for the first round was made on 17 June 2014 at 10am. Peterborough United were drawn away to Portsmouth.

Football League Trophy

Transfers

In

Out

Loans In

Loans Out

References

Peterborough United F.C. seasons
Peterborough United